Weardley is a village forming part of the Harewood Estate, at the northern edge of the City of Leeds metropolitan borough, West Yorkshire, England. The village is in the Harewood ward of the City of Leeds Metropolitan Council.

History
In 1870–1872, John Marius Wilson wrote that Weardley was a village of 1080 acres. Property was worth £1337, including quarries worth £150. The population of 171 people occupied 38 houses.

Weardley's former chapel is now in residential use.

References

External links

Villages in West Yorkshire
Places in Leeds